GwangjuSongjeong Station (formerly Songjeong-ri Station) is a station in Gwangju, South Korea. It is on the national high-speed KTX railway network, 341 km south of Yongsan Station.

History
The station opened on November 1, 1914, and the building was moved to its current location on September 18, 1988. KTX trains on the Honam Line began services on April 1, 2004.

The government of Gwangju City changed the name of Songjeong-ri station to GwangjuSongjeong station on April 1, 2009.

Services
GwangjuSongjeong Station serves KTX trains on the Honam Line. It also has express services and local services on the normal speed Honam Line and on the Gyeongjeon Line. Under the same name, the station is currently on Line 1 of Gwangju's subway network. From April 2, 2015, intercity bus stops were established in front of Songjeong station in Gwangju.

See also
 Transportation in South Korea
 Korail
 KTX

References

External links

Korea Train eXpress
Route Map
 Station information from Korail

Korea Train Express stations
Railway stations in Gwangju
Railway stations opened in 1913
Gwangsan District
1913 establishments in Korea